Jans Rautenbach (22 February 1936 – 2 November 2016) was a South African screenwriter, film producer and director. His 1968 film Die Kandidaat proved controversial and received some censorship in South Africa, because of perceived criticism of the apartheid system. His last film, Abraham, was a hit at the South African box office.

Selected filmography
Director
 Die Kandidaat (1968)
 Katrina (1969)
 Jannie Totsiens (1970)
 Pappalap (1971)
 Ongewenste Vreemdeling (1974)
 Eendag Op 'n Reendag (1976)
 My Way II (1977)
 Blink Stefaans (1981)
 Broer Matie (1984)
  (1984)
 Abraham (2015)

References

Bibliography
 Tomaselli, Keyan. The cinema of apartheid: race and class in South African film. Routledge, 1989.
 Botha, Martin & Steinmair, Deborah. Jans Rautenbach, dromer, baanbreker en auteur/Jans, droomsaaier – sy memoirs (biography & memoirs, in Afrikaans). Genugtig Uitgewers, 2006.

External links
 

1936 births
2016 deaths
Afrikaner people
South African film directors